Eilicrinia is a genus of moths in the family Geometridae.

Species
 Eilicrinia cordiaria (Hübner, 1790)
 Eilicrinia flava (Moore, 1888)
 Eilicrinia nuptalis (Bremer, 1864)
 Eilicrinia orias Wehrli, 1931
 Eilicrinia subcordiaria (Herrich-Schäffer, 1852)
 Eilicrinia trinotata (Metzner, 1845)
 Eilicrinia unimacularia Püngeler, 1914
 Eilicrinia wehrlii Djakonov, 1938

References
 Eilicrinia at Markku Savela's Lepidoptera and Some Other Life Forms
 Natural History Museum Lepidoptera genus database

Geometridae